The 2023 President of the Federal Senate of Brazil election took place on 1 February 2023, during the opening day of the 57th Legislature of the National Congress, almost four months after the 2022 elections.

It will result in the election of the President of the Federal Senate, two vice presidents, the positions of 1st, 2nd, 3rd and 4th Secretaries and their respective replacements. They will hold a biennial term (2023-2025), making it impossible for them to be re-elected in the same Legislature - as established in Art. 59 of the Internal Regulations of the Federal Senate. 

The election of the members of the Board of Directors of the Federal Senate will be carried out by a secret ballot, requiring a majority of votes, and also requiring the presence of a majority of the composition of the Senate and ensuring, as far as possible, the proportional participation of party representations or parliamentary blocs that act in the Federal Senate. (Art. 60 of the Internal Regulations of the Federal Senate).

The Dean of the Federal Senate, in this case, Oriovisto Guimarães (PODE–PR), will administer the oath of office en masse to the rest of the members of the Senate, and Rodrigo Pacheco (PSD–MG) will administer the oath of office to the new President.

Incumbent President Rodrigo Pacheco was able to run for a second consecutive term and was re-elected for his office.

Candidates

Confimed candidates
 Rodrigo Pacheco (PSD) – Senator for Minas Gerais since 2019; Member of the Chamber of Deputies 2015–2019.
 Rogério Marinho (PL) – Member of the Chamber of Deputies for Rio Grande do Norte since 2015, 2007–2012; Minister of Regional Development 2020–2022; Special Secretary of Social Security and Labour 2019–2020; State Secretary of Economic Development of Rio Grande do Norte 2012–2014.

Withdrawn candidates 

 Eduardo Girão (PODE) – Senator for Ceará since 2019; Chairman of Fortaleza Esporte Clube 2017. Girão announced on the election day he was withdrawing his candidacy, to support Rogério Marinho.

Formal voting

References 

2023 elections in Brazil
February 2023 events in Brazil
President of the Federal Senate of Brazil elections